The Titan's Curse is an American fantasy-adventure novel based on Greek mythology written by Rick Riordan. It was released on May 1, 2007, and is the third novel in the Percy Jackson & the Olympians series and the sequel to The Sea of Monsters. It is about the adventures of the 14-year-old demigod Percy Jackson as he and his friends go on a dangerous quest to rescue his 14-year-old demigod friend Annabeth Chase and the Greek goddess Artemis, who have both been kidnapped by the titans.

The Titan's Curse was published by Miramax Books, an imprint of Hyperion Books for Children and thus Disney Publishing (succeeded by the Disney Hyperion imprint). It was released in the United States and the United Kingdom on May 1, 2007. The novel was also released in audiobook format, read by Jesse Bernstein.

Mostly well-received, The Titan's Curse was nominated for numerous awards, winning ones such as the No. 1 The New York Times children's series best seller and Book Sense Top thirty Summer Pick for 2010.

Plot
Percy Jackson, Annabeth Chase, and Thalia Grace infiltrate the West Hall boarding school in Bar Harbor, Maine, to escort the siblings, Bianca and Nico di Angelo, to Camp Half-Blood. Though their extraction is a success, the manticore Dr. Thorn captures Annabeth, escaping when Artemis and her Hunters arrive. Artemis sets off alone to track down a monster which, in the wrong hands, has the power to destroy Mount Olympus. Beforehand, she sends the half-bloods and her Hunters to Camp Half-Blood, via her brother Apollo and his sun chariot. Bianca joins the Hunters, granting her immortality.
 
At camp, Percy and his pegasus Blackjack unknowingly rescue an Ophiotaurus which Percy nicknamed "Bessie". Artemis’ lieutenant Zoë Nightshade begins to have dreams of the goddess in danger, whilst Percy dreams of Annabeth saving Luke Castellan by holding up a cave's ceiling. The mummified Oracle of Delphi disrupts a capture the flag game to give Zoë a prophecy; instructing her to travel to Mount Tamalpais, the modern day location of the Titans’ domain of Mount Othrys, to rescue Artemis and Annabeth. Zoë takes Thalia, Bianca, and Grover Underwood with her on the quest. Percy decides to sneak off on his own, reluctantly promising Nico that he will protect Bianca.
 
Travelling to Washington D.C., Percy follows Thorn to the Smithsonian, witnessing Luke, Thorn, and a man called "The General" summoning spartoi to waylay Zoë's group. Percy warns his friends, helping them defeat the Nemean lion, claiming its impenetrable pelt as a reward. Zoë allows Percy to join the group, realising her prophecy implied this. They travel to Cloudcroft, New Mexico, where Grover senses the missing god Pan, who sends the Erymanthian Boar to help the group escape the spartoi.
 
They reach Gila Claw, Arizona, the "Junkyard of the Gods". Bianca reveals she and Nico unknowingly spent years in the Lotus Hotel, actually born in the 1930s, until taken to West Hall. Percy briefly has an encounter with Ares and Aphrodite, who warn him not to take anything from the junkyard. Bianca, regretting her choice to leave Nico, tries to take a figurine from the junkyard for her brother, awakening a prototype of Talos, giving her life to destroy it. The survivors sullenly travel to Hoover Dam, where Percy encounters Bessie, as well as Rachel Elizabeth Dare, a mortal who can see through the Mist, providing him an escape route by distracting the spartoi. The group fly to San Francisco with help from the dam's Winged Figures of the Republic.
 
Percy seeks out Nereus, learning that Bessie is the monster Artemis was hunting. After destroying Thorn, Percy sends Grover back to Camp Half-Blood with Bessie, sacrificing the lion pelt to his father Poseidon for his friend's safe passage. Percy, Zoë, and Thalia turn to Annabeth's father Frederick Chase for help, borrowing his car to reach Mount Othrys. There, they enter the Garden of the Hesperides, where Zoë is revealed to be the daughter of Atlas, the General's true identity. Zoë was exiled by her siblings after aiding Hercules steal a golden apple as per his labours, having gifted him with Percy's sword Riptide.
 
Reaching the peak of Mount Othrys, the group find Artemis holding up the sky, a role that Annabeth was also subjected too, explaining the true nature of Percy's dreams. Percy briefly takes the sky's weight, freeing Artemis. Luke tempts Thalia into joining Kronos’ forces, but she declines, knocking him off the mountainside. Percy and Artemis trap Atlas beneath the sky, but not before he casts Zoë off a cliff, mortally wounding her. Frederick flies to the rescue, piloting a Sopwith Camel, the half-bloods escaping to a nearby airfield where Zoë dies of her wounds, transformed into a new constellation by Artemis called the "Hunter".
 
Percy, Annabeth, Thalia, and Artemis travel to Mount Olympus to attend the gods’ winter solstice meeting, Artemis convincing the Olympians of the Titans’ threat. Bessie is kept on Olympus for safekeeping. Thalia joins the Hunters to forestall the Great Prophecy, in which a child of either Zeus, Poseidon, or Hades could be used to bring victory for Kronos. Percy learns from Poseidon that Luke is alive. Upon returning to Camp Half-Blood, Percy informs Nico of Bianca's demise. A distraught Nico blames Percy, revealing he is a son of Hades when he banishes the spartoi to the Underworld, before fleeing. Percy tells Annabeth and Grover of Nico's lineage, the trio promising to keep it a secret, fearful that Nico will be the subject of the Great Prophecy.

Characters 

 Percy Jackson: Percy, a 14-year-old demigod and son of Poseidon, is the protagonist as well as the series' narrator. He embarks on a journey to save Annabeth and the Greek goddess Artemis, who have both been kidnapped.
 Thalia Grace: Thalia is a 15-year-old demigod daughter of Zeus. Though she appears in Percy's dream in the first book, she makes a full appearance at the end of The Sea of Monsters and is given a greater role in the third book. Thalia is described as looking very punk, with electric blue eyes, black clothes, and spiky hair. Her personality is often described as "independent and many times sarcastic." While Thalia is a lot like Percy (due to both being children of the Big Three), and they become good friends before the events of the book, they often argue. She is heartbroken by Luke's betrayal of the camp and gods, as it is implied that she had feelings for him. She is also afraid of heights, which she reluctantly admits to Percy, despite the fact that she is the daughter of Zeus, God of the Sky. She joins the Huntress of Artemis as the new lieutenant to prevent her from being the child of the Great Prophecy with the permission of her father.
 Annabeth Chase: Annabeth is a 14-year-old demigod and the daughter of Athena. She is friends with Percy, Thalia, and Grover. She is kidnapped, along with Artemis, by the Titans. She has a great passion and interest in architecture, and wishes to be an architect when she is older. Although she has a growing love interest in Percy, her feelings for Luke remain a problem between the two. Percy returns her feelings without realizing it, and is oblivious to how she feels about him.
 Grover Underwood: A large-hearted satyr whose favorite foods are aluminum cans and cheese enchiladas. He is 28 years old, yet has the appearance of a teenager due to the satyrs' slower growth rate (half that of humans). He wants to become a searcher for Pan, the satyr god of nature and the wild, who fell into a "deep sleep" due to humans' pollution of the world.
 Bianca di Angelo: Bianca is a 12-year-old demigod and the daughter of Hades. She and her ten-year-old brother Nico were trapped in the Lotus Casino, where time is slowed down, but at the beginning of the book, they got out and she attended an army school in Bar Harbor, Maine. She is killed by an automaton during the quest in the "Junkyard of the Gods".
 Zoë Nightshade: Zoë is the daughter of Atlas, a banished Hesperid for helping the hero Hercules, the first lieutenant of the Hunters of Artemis, and the maker of Percy's sword, Riptide.  Due to her age, she often has trouble updating her language and speaking skills, and uses Middle English.  She dies after being bitten by Ladon the dragon, who protects the immortality-giving golden apple tree, and after her father Atlas throws her against a pile of rocks. Artemis turns her spirit into a constellation soon after her death. She and Thalia developed grudges against each other after Thalia refused to join the hunters before the events of the series, but they eventually get along before Zoë's demise.
 Luke Castellan: The 21-year-old demigod son of Hermes, Luke is the main antagonist of the series. He is the main crony to Kronos; Kronos' followers and army gather on a ship called the Princess Andromeda. He is thought dead when Thalia kicks him off Mount Tamalpais, but he is later revealed to have survived.
 Nico di Angelo: The 10-year-old demigod son of Hades, he and his older sister, Bianca, are rescued from a manticore by Percy, Annabeth, Thalia, and Grover. He is left at camp during the quest due to his young age, but stays in the Hermes cabin because his parentage has not yet been discovered. He leaves camp after hearing Percy broke his promise to him and letting Bianca die. Before he leaves, he sends an army of skeletal warriors back to the underworld, revealing his parentage.

Critical reception
The Titan's Curse received relatively positive reviews, which often lauded the humor and action in the story. Children's Literature, which commended the book's fast pace and humor, wrote, "Readers will relate to good natured Percy, the protagonist." Kirkus Reviews awarded it a starred review with, "This third in the Olympians series makes the Greek myths come alive in a way no dreary classroom unit can ... will have readers wondering how literature can be this fun. This can stand alone, though newcomers to the series will race back to the first two volumes and eagerly await a fourth installment." School Library Journal praised the "adventurous" plot as well as the book's appeal: "Teachers will cheer for Percy Jackson and the Olympians as they inspire students to embrace Greek mythology and score the ultimate Herculean challenge: getting kids to read. All in all, a winner of Olympic proportions and a surefire read-aloud." Booklist's starred review approved of the novel's humor, action, and plotting: "The Percy Jackson & the Olympians series is built around a terrific idea—that the half-mortal offspring of Greek gods live among us, playing out struggles of mythic scale—and Riordan takes it from strength to strength with this exciting installment, adding even more depth to the characters and story arc while retaining its predecessors' nonstop laughs and action." Kidsreads raved, "Rick Riordan's Olympian adventures have gained great popularity thanks to their combination of humor, adventure and a winning hero ... Readers who are familiar with ancient mythology will enjoy Riordan's tongue-in-cheek approach; those who aren't just might be tempted to go to the original sources to learn more."

Awards and nominations
The Titan's Curse received several literature-related awards, including: number one The New York Times children's series best seller and Book Sense Top Ten Summer Pick for 2007. It was also a Quill Award nominee.

Audiobook
An eight-hour-and-forty-eight-minute audiobook read by the actor Jesse Bernstein and published by Listening Library was released on April 24, 2007.

AudioFile Magazine lauded Bernstein's interpretation, writing, "Sounding alternately young, or old, or really scary, Jesse Bernstein ... effectively voices the confusion and loss the team experiences."

Sequel

In The Battle of the Labyrinth, Annabeth and Percy find an entrance into the Labyrinth during a game of capture the flag. Percy soon learns that Luke had used the entrance and will lead his army through the Labyrinth straight in to the heart of camp. To get into the Labyrinth, Percy has to find the symbol of Daedalus, the Greek letter delta, (Δ) on a passageway, touch it, and then enter the Labyrinth. Using the Labyrinth, Percy tries to find Daedalus so Luke cannot get Ariadne's string, thereby foiling Luke's invasion.

See also

 Mythology
 Greek gods

References

External links
 Rick Riordan Myth Master at publisher Penguin Books (UK)
 Percy Jackson & the Olympians at publisher Disney-Hyperion Books (US)
 

2007 American novels
Percy Jackson & the Olympians
2007 fantasy novels
Sequel novels
2007 children's books
Novels set in San Francisco
Novels set in Maine
Novels set in Washington, D.C.
Novels set in New Mexico
Novels by Rick Riordan